Calotes desilvai, commonly known as the Morningside lizard, or the Ceylon black-band whistling lizard, is a species of lizard in the family Agamidae. Calotes desilvai is one of seven Calotes species endemic to Sri Lanka.

Etymology
The specific name, desilvai, is in honor of Sri Lankan herpetologist Anslem de Silva.

Habitat

Description
C. desilvai has the following characteristics. The bands on the gular area are black. The shoulder pit is black. The scales on the ventral surface of the thigh are smooth.

Behavior
C. desilvai is arboreal and diurnal.

Reproduction
C. desilvai is oviparous.

References

External links
 http://animaldiversity.ummz.umich.edu/accounts/Calotes_desilvai/classification/
 http://www.wildreach.com/reptile/Sauria/Calotes%20desilvai.php

Further reading
Bahir MM, Maduwage KP (2005). "Calotes desilvai, a new species of agamid lizard from Morningside Forest, Sri Lanka". Raffles Bulletin of Zoology Supplement (12): 381-392.
Somaweera R, Somaweera N (2009). Lizards of Sri Lanka, A Colour Guide with Field Keys. Frankfurt am Main, Germany: Edition Chimaira / Serpents Tale. 304 pp. .

desilvai
Reptiles of Sri Lanka
Reptiles described in 2005
Taxa named by Kalana Maduwage